Zilmukmakhi (Dargwa: Зильмукьмахьи) is a rural locality (a selo) in Usishinsky Selsoviet, Akushinsky District, Republic of Dagestan, Russia. The population was 325 as of 2010.

Geography 
Zilmukmakhi is located 11 km east of Akusha (the district's administrative centre) by road, on the Shinkvalikotta River. Kakmakhi is the nearest rural locality.

References 

Rural localities in Akushinsky District